Dobrinka Mincheva (born 10 January 1962) is a Bulgarian swimmer. She competed in three events at the 1980 Summer Olympics.

References

1962 births
Living people
Bulgarian female swimmers
Olympic swimmers of Bulgaria
Swimmers at the 1980 Summer Olympics
Place of birth missing (living people)